Yaris most commonly refers to a Toyota vehicle with the name in various forms:
Toyota Yaris hatchback for the Asian markets, also known as the Yaris L in China
Toyota Vitz, also sold as the Toyota Yaris hatchback
Toyota Belta, also sold as the Toyota Yaris sedan
Toyota Vios, also sold as the Toyota Yaris in the second and third generation
Toyota Yaris iA sedan for the North, Latin and South American market, formerly the Scion iA until August 2016, based on the third-generation Mazda2
Yaris (video game), a video game promoting the Toyota models.

Yaris may also refer to:

Other uses
Yarış, Yenice, a village in Turkey

Sol Yaris, a Brazilian paraglider design